V Sport Motor is a Swedish motorsport channel that launched on 17 October 2008.

Events broadcast on the channel include Formula One, NASCAR, IndyCar, GP2, WRC, European Rallycross Championship, Formula 1 boat, Offshore Class 1, 24 hours of Nürburgring and MotoGP.

In 2020, the channel's name was changed from Viasat Motor to V Sport Motor.

Commentators
Janne Blomqvist (Sweden)
Eje Elgh (Sweden)
Ted Westerfors (Sweden)
Frida Nordstrand (Sweden)
Henka Gustafsson (Sweden)
Hubbe Berg (Sweden)
Johan Stigefeldt (Sweden)
Niklas Jihde (Sweden)
Thomas Nilsson (Sweden)
Tobias Lyon (Sweden)
Atle Gulbrandsen (Norway)
Thomas Schie (Norway)
Henning Isdal (Norway)
Stein Pettersen (Norway)
Stein Rømmerud (Norway)
Dag Steinar Sundby (Norway)

References

External links
Viasat Motor 
Viasat Motor 

V Sport
Auto racing mass media
Defunct television channels in Norway
Television channels in Norway
Television channels in Sweden
Television channels and stations established in 2008